Alexander Gorgon (born 28 October 1988) is an Austrian-Polish footballer who plays for Pogoń Szczecin in Ekstraklasa.

Career statistics

Club statistics

Honours

Club
Austria Wien
Austrian Bundesliga: 2012–13

Rijeka
Croatian First Football League: 2016–17
Croatian Cup: 2016–17, 2018–19, 2019–20

References

External links

HNK Rijeka player profile 

Austrian footballers
Polish footballers
Association football midfielders
Austrian people of Polish descent
1988 births
Living people
Footballers from Vienna
Austrian Football Bundesliga players
FK Austria Wien players
HNK Rijeka players
Pogoń Szczecin players
Croatian Football League players
Ekstraklasa players
III liga players
Austrian expatriate footballers
Expatriate footballers in Croatia
Expatriate footballers in Poland
Austrian expatriate sportspeople in Croatia
Austria youth international footballers